Nick Lowe (born 1949), is an English singer-songwriter, musician and producer.

Nick Lowe may also refer to:
Nick Lowe (classicist) (born 1956), British classical scholar and film critic
Nick Lowe (comics) (born 1979), American comics editor

See also
Nicholas Low (1739–1826), American merchant and developer